JW GROM (full name: Jednostka Wojskowa GROM im. Cichociemnych Spadochroniarzy Armii Krajowej, English: Military Unit GROM named in honour of the Silent Unseen of the Home Army) is a Polish special forces unit and forms part of the Special Troops Command of the Polish Armed Forces.

The unit's other name is Jednostka Wojskowa 2305 (Military Unit No. 2305). GROM operators gained the nickname of "The Surgeons" due to their extensive medical training and knowledge and their surgical ability to coordinate and execute special operations. GROM was formed in 1990 with training provided to the initial GROM operators by the US Army Delta Force and the British Army Special Air Service.

History

Early history
GROM, which stands for Grupa Reagowania Operacyjno-Manewrowego (English: Group (for) Operational Maneuvering Response), which also means "thunderbolt", is one of five special forces units in the Special Troops Command. It was officially activated on July 13, 1990. It is deployed in a variety of special operations and unconventional warfare roles, including anti-terrorist operations and projection of force behind enemy lines.

The unit was named after the Silent Unseen (Polish: Cichociemni Spadochroniarze Armii Krajowej) – Poland's elite World War II special-operations unit.

In the 1970s and 1980s, there were several formations of special forces units within Poland, but these were either trained in purely military tasks (sabotage, disruption of communications and such) or in purely counter-terrorist roles. After the Polish embassy in Bern was taken over by a group of four Polish emigrants calling themselves Polish Revolutionary Home Army in 1982, General Edwin Rozłubirski proposed that a clandestine military unit be established to counter the threat from terrorism and other unconventional threats. This proposal, however, was initially rejected by the People's Army of Poland.

In 1989, many Jews were allowed to emigrate from the Soviet Union to Israel. Poland was one of the handful of countries that provided aid in the form of organization for the operation, later dubbed Operation Bridge (Operacja Most). After two Polish diplomats were shot in Beirut, Lt. Col. Sławomir Petelicki was sent to Lebanon to secure the transfer of civilians and the Polish diplomatic outposts.

Upon his return to Poland, he presented his plan for the creation of a special military unit to the Ministry of Interior, a force that would be trained in special operations to be deployed in the defense of Polish citizens in situations similar to the one in Lebanon. Petelicki's ideas were well received, and on June 13, 1990, GROM was formally established as JW 2305.

Sławomir Petelicki was chosen as the first commander of the newly formed unit. As a Polish intelligence officer from Służba Bezpieczeństwa specializing in sabotage and subversion, he seemed perfectly suited to oversee the unit's initial formation. He gathered around himself a group of like-minded and professional soldiers, functionaries and set about choosing soldiers that would be fit for special operations. Due to the high risks involved in special service, it was decided that all men should be from professional service. The first batch of recruits all came from a variety of already-existing special units within the Polish Armed Forces. Among these were:

 1 Batalion Szturmowy from Lubliniec (then known as 1 Pulk Specjalny Komandosów and now known as JW Komandosów)
 48, 56 and 62 Kompania Specjalna
 6 Brygada Desantowo-Szturmowa
 Polish Navy divers
 Anti-terrorist units of the Policja
 Mechanised Warfare Officer School in Wrocław
 Reconnaissance units of PAF

Out of the possible recruits, only a small group passed the training. Many of these initial instructors were trained by the special forces of the United States and the United Kingdom. Currently, Jednostka Wojskowa GROM is co-operating with similar units of other NATO countries.

During its formative first few years, JW 2305 remained completely secret and hidden from the public. It was first reported to the press in 1992 and became known to the public in 1994, after their first major military operation in Haiti.

Before October 1, 1999, JW 2305 was subordinate to the Ministry of Internal Affairs, after which time command was transferred to the Minister of National Defence, until 2007. Since 2007 JW GROM is under the command of Dowódca Wojsk Specjalnych (Commander of Polish Special Forces).

War on Terror

A 40-man GROM element deployed to Afghanistan in early 2002.

For the 2003 invasion of Iraq, GROM formed the part of the core of the Naval Special Operations Task Group, along with US Navy SEALs, British Royal Marines and attached US Psy Ops and civil affairs teams. On March 20, 2003, US Marines from 1st F.A.S.T. Company and GROM operators assaulted the KAAOT Oil Terminals, whilst US Marines from 1st F.A.S.T. Company and US Navy SEALs from SEAL Team 8 and 10 seized the MABOT oil terminal, both terminals were seized with no casualties and explosives which were found on the terminals were made safe by GROM and SEAL operators. A mixed team of 35 GROM operators and 20 US Navy SEALs from SEAL Team 5 seized the Mukatayin hydroelectric dam, 57 miles northeast of Baghdad. Iraqi troops guarding the dam surrendered without a fight, there were no casualties to the team (with the exception of one GROM soldier, who broke an ankle during the insertion from a US Air Force MH-53J Pave Low helicopter. SEAL and GROM units continued to cooperate throughout the rest of the invasion phase, with raids and anti-sniper missions in Baghdad.

Following the invasion, GROM operators formed the core of Task Unit Thunder, as an element of CJSOTF-AP (Combined Joint Special Operations Task Force-Arabian Peninsula), providing a Tier-1 counterterrorism unit for the task force. Along with Task Unit Raider (consisting of Det One operators), both units became the task force's primary direct action assets, operating in conjunction on multiple occasions.

A GROM sniper aided Det One's in its first "real" mission - a close target reconnaissance operation - in which the sniper apprehended the target, (a suspected insurgent sniper). GROM's early success in Iraq made it a valuable contributor to CJSOTF-AP. In September 2004, US Navy SEAL sniper Chris Kyle was temporarily assigned to GROM's Combat Team B in Baghdad for a week. The CIA reportedly found GROM snipers useful due to their low rules of engagement threshold. In 2007, US Army Special Forces, Polish GROM conducted Operation Jackal against insurgents in Diwaniyah.

In 2007, GROM and JW Komandosów were deployed to Kandahar (after earlier successful tours of Iraq operating alongside US Navy SEALs) under direct US Command. They weren't restricted by any national caveats-the only restriction placed on them was regarding cross-border operations into Pakistan. Along with Direct Action successes, they were considered very effective in training and mentoring Afghan National Police units.

Training

Candidates applying to serve in JW GROM have to pass psychological and durability tests, along with the so-called truth test, a physically and psychologically exhausting field test designed to filter out the weaker applicants.

The training of GROM soldiers includes a variety of disciplines. All of them undergo the same specialized training in anti-terrorism and special operations, as well as frogman, sniping, and parachuting. In four-man teams, each soldier must be prepared to assume the respective responsibilities of his colleagues, should it become necessary. JW GROM receives basic special operations training from the Swedish Navy's Special Command for Tactical Operations based in Karlskrona, Sweden's primary Naval Base. Approximately 75% of GROM personnel are trained as medics or paramedics. In addition, each group is supported by several professional physicians. GROM soldiers are trained in capture or kill methods.

Organization
Command and support staff in Warsaw
 A Squadron (ZBA) – Land Element located in Warsaw
 B Squadron (ZBB) – Maritime Element located in Gdańsk
 C Squadron (ZBC) – Specialty unknown located in Warsaw
 Logistic and security unit located in Warsaw

Known operations
Most of unit's operations remain classified, the known ones are listed below.

 1990 – 1992 Operacja Most
 1992 – "Antoni Macierewicz briefcases" affair (Close protection duty during political problems in Poland).
 1992 – Assault on residence and arrest of one of the bosses of Art B (a political and economic scandal in Poland).
 1994 – Operation Uphold Democracy in Haiti.
 1996 – UNTAES mission in eastern Slavonia, Croatia to arrest Slavko Dokmanović – they have since managed to arrest at least six more Serbian war-criminals.
 1996 – Bodyguard duties during US ambassador W.G Walker's mission in Kosovo and Macedonia.
 1999 – Bodyguard duties during US ambassador W.G Walker's mission in Kosovo and Macedonia.
 2001 – Hunt for war criminals in Kosovo.
 2001 – Recon mission in Afghanistan before the arrival of Polish troops.
 2002 – 2004 – Mission in Afghanistan (VIP bodyguarding, base protecting duties and other).
 2002 – 2003 – Mission in Persian Gulf. Maritime Interdiction Operations.
 2003 – 2004, 2007–2008 – GROM soldiers took part in the Operation Iraqi Freedom. Also operated in Iraq after May, 2003.
 2007 –2021 – GROM was part of Special Forces in Afghanistan, as Task Force 49, operating in Ghazni Province.
 2012 – Protection of Polish and International civilians during the Euro 2012 football tournament.
 2022 - Protection of Polish President Andrzej Duda during his visit in Ukraine amids the Russian invasion.

Equipment

Handguns
 IMI Desert Eagle Mark XIX – likely used only in a training capacity 
 FN Five-seveN  – a few units
 Glock 17 & 17T
 Heckler & Koch Mark 23 – a few units
 Heckler & Koch USP 
 SIG P226 & P228 
 Colt-1911 – a few units, captured after Haiti-mission

Assault rifles
 Bushmaster M4A3 assault rifle (often with M203 grenade launcher)  – withdrawn from use, replaced by Heckler & Koch HK416
 Bushmaster XM15E2S
 FN F2000 Tactical – a few units
 Heckler & Koch G36 assault rifles in various versions – a few units
 Heckler & Koch HK416 D10RS and D145RS
 KAC SR-16 (an AR-15 type rifle) – withdrawn from use, replaced by Heckler & Koch HK416
 Colt M4A1 assault rifle (with RIS) – withdrawn from use, replaced by Heckler & Koch HK416
 SIG SG 551 – a few units
 Steyr AUG  – a few units

Submachine guns/personal defense weapons
 Heckler & Koch MP5 submachine gun withdrawn from use, replaced by Sig MPX from 2019
 SIG MPX 
 FN P90 TR  – a few units

Machine guns
 FN Minimi Para & TR
 Manroy M2 QCB

Precision rifles
 Accuracy International AWM-F sniper rifle .338 LM round
 CheyTac Intervention - a few units (.408 Cheyenne Tactical chambering) heavy sniper rifle
 Heckler & Koch PSG1
 KAC SR-25 marksman rifle withdrawn from use, replaced by LaRue Tactical OBR 7.62
 LaRue Tactical OBR 7.62 marksman rifle
 PGM Mini Hécate II .338 Lapua Magnum sniper rifle
 PGM Hécate II
 Sako TRG-22 sniper rifle

Launchers/anti-material weapons
 Barrett M107 anti-matériel sniper rifle
 Saab Bofors Dynamics Carl Gustav M3 MAAWS
 Saab Bofors Dynamics AT4
 Zeveta RPG-75
 LRM vz. 99 ANTOS - a Czech-made 60mm mortar
 Rafael Spike
 Raytheon-Lockheed Martin Javelin

Commanders
 Brigadier General Sławomir Petelicki (June 13, 1990–December 19, 1995)
 Brigadier General Marian Sowiński (December 19, 1995–December 6, 1997)
 Brigadier General Sławomir Petelicki (December 7, 1997–September 17, 1999)
 Colonel Zdzisław Żurawski (September 17, 1999–May 26, 2000)
 Colonel Roman Polko (May 26, 2000–February 11, 2004)
 Colonel Tadeusz Sapierzyński (February 11, 2004–February 23, 2006)
 Brigadier General Roman Polko (February 23, 2006–November 8, 2006)
 Colonel Piotr Patalong (November 8, 2006–March 25, 2008)
 Colonel Jerzy Gut (March 25, 2008–July 24, 2008)
 Colonel Dariusz Zawadka (July 24, 2008– August 6, 2010)
 Colonel Jerzy Gut (August 6, 2010– July 28, 2011)
 Colonel Piotr Gąstał (July 28, 2011– September 7, 2016)
 Colonel Robert Kopacki (September 8, 2016– March 14, 2017)
 Colonel Mariusz Pawluk (March 14, 2017– December 31, 2019)
 Colonel Grzegorz Mikłusiak (January 1, 2020–)

References

 Neville, Leigh,  Special Forces in the War on Terror (General Military), Osprey Publishing, 2015

External links

 JW Grom fan page
 ShadowSpear Special Operations
 The GROM factor 
 Specwar.info - Special Forces Encyclopedia
 
 Navy SEALs - Operational History

Military counterterrorist organizations
Special forces units and formations
Special forces of Poland
1990 establishments in Poland
Military units and formations established in 1990